Scymnus monticola, is a species of beetle found in the family Coccinellidae discovered by Thomas Lincoln Casey Jr. in 1899. It is found in North America.

References 

Beetles of North America
Insects described in 1899